The Leards Range Lights are a set of two range lights (rear and front) on Prince Edward Island, Canada. They were built in 1879, and are still active.

See also
 List of lighthouses in Prince Edward Island
 List of lighthouses in Canada

References

External links
Picture of Leards Range Rear Light Lighthouse Friends
 Aids to Navigation Canadian Coast Guard

Lighthouses completed in 1879
Lighthouses in Prince Edward Island